Turning 30!!! is a 2011 Indian romance film produced by Prakash Jha and is also the directorial debut of Alankrita Shrivastava, a longtime assistant of Jha.

The movie features Gul Panag, Siddharth Makkar and Purab Kohli, with music composed by the music director duo of Sidharth-Suhas, whose past works include Dil Dosti and Bhram.The film is a young urban love story and women centric film.

Plot
Turning 30 is the story of the protagonist of the movie Naina (Gul Panag) who is about to celebrate her big three oh and life is a perfect picture with a good job and the perfect guy. However, things turn into a nightmare when her boyfriend breaks up with her to marry a girl who can finance his fathers failing business. She has some setbacks at work when the credit for all her ideas and hardwork goes to undeserving people. With few days left for her birthday she is in a mess - constantly trying to win the guy back. The movie also tells the stories of her two best friends Malini and Ruksana who stand by her and support her though they are going through some rough patches in their lives.

Cast

 Gul Panag as Naina
 Purab Kohli as Jay
 Siddharth Makkar as Rishab
 Tillotama Shome as Malini
 Jeneva Talwar as Ruksana
 Anita Kanwar as Naina's Mother
 Rahul Singh
 Sameer Malhotra
 Bikramjeet Kanwarpal
 Satyadeep Mishra
 Karaan Singh
 Ira Dubey in a Special Appearance
 Anuj Tikku as Annirudh

Review
NDTV movie review gave 2 out of 5 stars stating "..what sinks this ship is the lame writing". Rediff movies review gave 1.5 out 5 stating "..A film can't be both empowering and embarrassing -- and here the latter is painfully predominant"

Soundtrack
The music is composed by Siddharth-Suhas. Lyrics are penned by Suhas, Kumaar, Ram Goutam, and Prashant Pandey.

Track listing

References

External links
 
 
 

2011 films
Films set in Mumbai
2010s Hindi-language films
2010s feminist films
Indian feminist films
Indian buddy comedy films
2010s buddy comedy films
2011 comedy films